Brian L. Stafford was the 20th Director of the United States Secret Service. Preceded by Lewis C. Merletti, he was sworn in on March 4, 1999 by the then Secretary of the Treasury, Robert E. Rubin. He was succeeded by W. Ralph Basham.

Education

Stafford was born in Sharpsville, Pennsylvania in 1948.       
He attended Mount Union College, in Alliance, Ohio, where he received a Bachelor of Arts degree in Business Administration, and an honorary Doctorate in Humane Letters. Prior to his induction into the Secret Service, Stafford served in the United States Army. He completed a one-year tour of duty in Vietnam, where he earned the Bronze Star Medal. He has been bestowed with numerous other awards including the Vietnam Gallantry Cross with Palm, Vietnam Campaign Medal, Vietnam Service Medal, Army Commendation Medal, National Defense Service Medal, 1999 Presidential Rank Award, and the Adam Walsh Rainbow Award.

Career

Stafford joined the United States Secret Service in 1971. His first occupation in the Secret Service was a special agent assigned to the Atlanta Field Office. He was later employed in various other positions such as the Assistant Director of the Office of Protective Operations and the Assistant Special Agent in Charge of the Office of Protective Operations. Stafford protected Presidents Richard Nixon, Gerald Ford, Jimmy Carter, Ronald Reagan, George H. W. Bush and Bill Clinton. He was also responsible for supervising several National Special Security Events including the 2002 Winter Olympics and the Super Bowl XXXVI. He retired in January 2003, after serving more than 30 years for the Secret Service. 

Stafford currently serves as a Director of McKinley Capital Management, and Vice Chairman of the National Center for Missing and Exploited Children.

References

1948 births
United States Secret Service agents
University of Mount Union alumni
Living people
People from Mercer County, Pennsylvania
Directors of the United States Secret Service